Michael or Mike Donnelly may refer to:

 Michael Donnelly (politician), Irish Fianna Fáil Senator from 1977 to 1981
 Michael Donnelly (priest) (1927–1982), Roman Catholic priest from Ireland
 Michael Donnelly (veteran) (1959–2005), United States Air Force (USAF) and advocate of veterans of the Gulf war
 Michael P. Donnelly (judge) (born 1966), American judge
 Michael P. Donnelly (admiral), United States Navy admiral and naval flight officer
 Michael Donnelly (Santa Barbara), a fictional character from Santa Barbara
 Mike Donnelly (born 1963), American ice hockey player
Micky Donnelly (1952–2019), Northern Irish painter

See also
 Mickey Donnelly (disambiguation)